The Eastern Theater Command Navy, or East Sea Fleet (ESF), is one of the three fleets of the People's Liberation Army Navy, operating in the East China Sea under the Eastern Theater Command. It was the first naval force formed by the People's Liberation Army, on 23 April 1949 and was initially based at Shanghai. Renamed in 1955, it has since been assigned to be part of the People's Liberation Army Navy and its headquarters have been moved to Ningbo, Zhejiang Province, but the fleet continues to patrol the East China Sea. Its flagship is the Type 052C destroyer Changchun.

The fleet was used in a support role during the People's Liberation Army's (PLA) invasion of the Kuomintang-held island of Yijiangshan on 14 January 1955. It has engaged in numerous other battles against the Republic of China Armed Forces. It has also operated in support of the South Sea Fleet against the People's Army of Vietnam during the 1980s.

Major naval bases of the fleet
 Ningbo Fleet Headquarters
 Shanghai Naval Base
 Xiangshan Naval Base
 Zhoushan Naval Base
 Fujian Naval Base

Ships in the fleet

Amphibious assault ship
 2 Type 075 landing helicopter dock (Yushen-class) 
 Guangxi (32)
 Anhui     (33, 安徽)

Destroyers
 8 Type 052D (Luyang III-class)
 Xiamen (154)
 Nanjing (155)
 Zibo (156)
 Lishui(157)
 Taiyuan (131)
 Suzhou (132)
 Baotou (133)
 Shaoxing(134)
 4 Type 052C (Luyang II-class)
 Changchun (150)- flagship of the Fleet
 Zhengzhou (151)
 Jinan (152)
 Xi'an (153)
 4 Sovremenny-class (现代, Project 956EM)
 956E Type
 Hangzhou (136)
 Fuzhou (137)
 956EM Type
 Taizhou (138)
 Ningbo (139)

Frigates
 12 Type 054A (Jiangkai II-class):
 Binzhou (515)
 Ziyang (522，资阳）
 Zhoushan (529)
 Xuzhou (530)
 Xiangtan (531)
 Jingzhou (532)
 Nantong (533)
 Yiyang (548)
 Changzhou (549)
 Huanggang (577)
 Yangzhou (578)
Anyang (599)
 2 Type 054 (Jiangkai I-class):
 Ma'anshan (525)
 Wenzhou (526)
 4 Type 053H3 Jiangwei II-class:
 Jiaxing (521)
 Lianyungang (522)
 Putian (523)
 Sanming (524)
 2 Type 053H1G (Jianghu V-class ):
 Beihai (558)
 Foshan (559)

Corvettes
 10 Type 056 (Jiangdao-class):
 Bengbu (582)
 Shangrao (583)
 Ji'an (586)
 Quanzhou (588)
 Sanmenxia (593)
 Suzhou (503)
 Baoding (511)
 Heze (512)
 Ningde (510)
 Ezhou (513)

Diesel-electric submarines
 8 Kilo-class:
 364
 365
 366
 367
 368
 369
 374
 375
 10 Type 039A/B/C
 330
 331
 332
 333
 334
 335
 336
 337
 338
 339

Landing ships
 3 Type 071 amphibious transport dock ( Yuzhao-Class):
 Yimeng Shan (988)
 Longhu Shan (980)
 Siming  Shan (986)
 7 Type 072A landing ship (Yuting III-class):
 Baxian Shan (913)
 Wuyi    Shan (914)
 Culai    Shan (915)
 Tianmu Shan (916)
 Wutai   Shan (917)
 Dabie   Shan (981)
 TaihangShan (982)
 4 Type 072II LST (Yuting-class):
 Lingyan Shan (930)
 Dongting Shan(931
 Helan   Shan  (932)
 Liupan Shan  (933)
5 Type 072III LST (Yuting-I class
Yandang Shan (908)
Jiuhua     Shan (909)
Putuo      Shan (939)
Huanggang Shan (910)
Tiantai     Shan (940)
4 Type 073A LSM (Yudao class)
Cheng     Shan (941)
Lu Shan (942)
Meng Shan (943)
Yu Shan (944)

Replenishment ships
 3 Type 903/A (Fuchi-class)
 Qiandaohu (886)
 Chaohu (890)
 Gaoyaohu (904 old 966)

Rescue and salvage ship
 1 Type 920 Hospital Ship
 Daishan      dao (866, 岱山岛）
 1 Type 925 submarine support ship (Dajiang-class) 
 Chongmingdao (862)

+ various support and accessorY ships

See also 

 People's Liberation Army Navy
 North Sea Fleet
 South Sea Fleet

References

External links 
 GlobalSecurity.org

 
Fleets of the People's Liberation Army Navy
East China Sea
Eastern Theater Command
Nanjing Military Region
Military units and formations established in 1949
1949 establishments in China